Ahmed Aliyu Sokoto (born 1 January 1970) is a Nigerian politician, who was recently declared the governor-elect of Sokoto State on the platform of A P C. He was a former commissioner and was the Deputy Governor of Sokoto State between 2015 and 2019.

Early life and background
Ahmed Aliyu was born on 1 January 1970, in Kaduna. He has worked as a cashier, an auditor and an accountant. He was deputy director of Finance and Supply, Sabon-Birni Local Government, 1996 to 1998; Director Finance and Supply, Kebbe Local Chief Accountant Local Government Service Commission, 2004 to 2007.
He was a two-term Commissioner and  the first Executive Secretary of Police Trust Fund (PTF).

References

Living people